Elizabeth Darcy may refer to:

Elizabeth Savage, Countess Rivers (1581–1650), née Darcy
Elizabeth Darcy, Countess of Ormond